Hotel Paris may refer to:

 Hotel Paris (Idaho), a hotel in Paris, Idaho, United States
 Hotel París (Huelva), a hotel in Huelva, Spain
 Hotel Paris (Prague), a hotel in Prague, Czech Republic